The Persekutuan Pengakap Negara Brunei Darussalam, the national Scouting organization of Brunei, was founded in 1933, and became a member of the World Organization of the Scout Movement in 1981. It began with 12 Scouts in 1933, in 1961 it had 322 Scouts, and by 2011 it rose to 2.086.

History
In January 1933, Chegu Marsal bin Maun, a teacher at Sekolah Melayu Jalan Pemancha, Pekan (Jalan Pemancha Malay School) formed a Scout troop with 12 boys. Chegu Awang Zaidi bin awang Taha, headmaster of the school, who was also the head of the Education Department became the Scoutmaster and Chegu Marsal bin Maun was the Assistant Scoutmaster. Thus began Scouting in Brunei.

The Brunei Scout Association was registered with The Boy Scout Association in London in 1939. It was then known as Persatuan Tempatan Negeri Brunei.

There were no English Medium schools in Brunei before 1940. So the boys who wished to study English were sent to the Government English School, in neighbouring Labuan. Most of these students joined the First Labuan Scout Troop of the school. The coronation of Sultan Ahmad Tajuddin took place on March 17, 1940. That was a great event in Brunei. The Mentri Besar Dato Hj. Ibrahim bin Mohd. Jaafar invited the First Labuan Scout Troop of the Government English School, to come and participate in the celebrations. So the Scouts with their Scoutmasters V.A. George and S.N. Nair came to Brunei, joined the celebrations and lined up along Jalan Sultan during the procession. It was a memorable occasion and all the Scouts were presented with souvenirs. After completing their studies at Labuan, the Scouts returned to their homeland. Their effort made the Brunei Scout Association grow.

District associations
Brunei Darussalam is divided into four administrative districts, Brunei-Muara, Tutong, Kuala Belait and Temburong. By 2007, all four districts had their own District Associations.

The Brunei-Muara District Boy Scout Local Association had used the State Scout headquarters building at Jalan Sinuai, Kumbang Pasang as its headquarters.
The Seria-Kula Belait District Boy Scout Local Association. First Scout troop in this district was opened in 1939 and was led by Che’gu Salleh bin Masri. Its headquarters was near the Anthony Abell College.
Tutong District. First Scout troop in this district was opened in 1939 and was led by Che’gu Osman bin Bidin. The Tutong District Association was formed in the 80's.

State headquarters
The Government provided facilities to the Persatuan Tempatan Negeri Brunei at Jalan Sinuai, Kumbang Pasang in the capital Brunei Town (now Bandar Seri Begawan. This was the first State Scout headquarters. But this building was taken over by the security forces and they were there from December 12, 1962 to October 15, 1963. A new state Headquarters and camp site was built at km. 6, Jalan Gadong and the headquarters was moved to this place on January 27, 1971.

At the State Headquarters and campsite area in Jalan Gadong, a project to build a multipurpose complex with facilities for Scout Headquarters began in 1997 and was completed in 2000. The six-story Scout headquarters was used by Brunei Scout Association from 2001. It was officially opened in July 2005.

Program and ideals
The Scout activities places emphasis on tolerance, respect for religious convictions and respect for others.

The Scout Motto is Selalu Bersedia, Be Prepared.

Cub scouts (Pengakap Tunas) — between 10–12 years old
Junior Scouts (Pengakap Muda) — between 13–15 years old
Venture Scouts (Pengakap Remaja) — between 15–18 years old
Rover Scouts (Pengakap Kelana) — between 18–26 years old

The highest rank is the Pengakap Sultan, Sultan Scout. The membership badge of the Persekutuan Pengakap Negara Brunei Darussalam incorporates the coat of arms of Brunei.

Following Overseas and State events as recorded in the Annual reports of the Scout Association.

Overseas events
Hong Kong – 5 Scouts and one leader attended the Golden Jubilee Jamborette in Hongkong from December 27, 1961 to January 2, 1962.

Sarawak – 12 Scouts attended the first Sarawak National Training Camp in 1962.

Greece. - 6 Scouts and 2 leaders attended the Eleventh World Scout Jamboree held at Marathon, Greece from August 1 to 12, 1963.

Thailand – 39 Scouts attended the Thailand Jamboree from November 27 to December 4, 1965.

Taiwan – Chegu Shahbuddin bin Salleh attended the Taipei conference from October 9 to 15, 1966.

Malaysia – 19 Scouts and Leader attended the Malaysian jamboree from December 4 to 10, 1966, held at Penang.

National camps
201 Scouts from all over the State attended a State Scout camp organised at Jerudong from December 7 to 10, 1962.  Due to unforeseen circumstances, the camp was suddenly closed on December 8.
A state Scout Camp was held at Jerudong from December 13 to 15, 1963.
500 Scouts attended the State Camp held at Gadong Camp site from April 27 to 30, 1967.
State Scout camps were held at Gadong Camp site from April 19 to 22, 1969 and from April 18 to 21, 1970

Cuboree
The first cuboree was held from June 15 to June 19, 2008. It was attended by delegations from several countries.

References

See also
Girl Guides Association of Brunei Darussalam (Persatuan Pandu Puteri Brunei Darussalam)

World Organization of the Scout Movement member organizations
Scouting and Guiding in Brunei
Youth organizations established in 1933